Alfonso Pinto (born 4 October 1978) is an Italian former amateur boxer. He won silver medals at the European Championships in 2004 and 2006, both at light flyweight.

Career
Pinto won the silver medal at the 2004 European Amateur Boxing Championships in Pula losing to Sergey Kazakov.

He participated in the 2004 Summer Olympics for his native country. He was beaten in the quarterfinals of the light flyweight (48 kg) division by Turkey's eventual runner-up Atagün Yalçınkaya.

He then repeated his silver medal win at the 2006 European Amateur Boxing Championships.

External links
Alfonso Pinto on Repubblica Napoli. Video edited by Beniamino Daniele
Yahoo! Sports

1978 births
Living people
Flyweight boxers
Boxers at the 2004 Summer Olympics
Olympic boxers of Italy
Italian male boxers
People from Torre Annunziata

Mediterranean Games gold medalists for Italy
Competitors at the 2005 Mediterranean Games
Mediterranean Games medalists in boxing
Sportspeople from the Province of Naples
21st-century Italian people